Halo is a live album by Current 93, released in 2004. The cover is a drawing by David Tibet, which reproduces the cover of The Moody Blues' 1971 album Every Good Boy Deserves Favour.

Track listing
 "Halo"
 "Alone"
 "Mary Waits in Silence"
 "Calling for Vanished Faces II"
 "The Signs in the Stars"
 "All This World Makes Great Blood"
 "Good Morning, Great Moloch"
 "Whilst the Night Rejoices Profound and Still"
 "5 Hypnagogue 5"
 "Silence Song"
 "Sleep Has His House"
 "4 Hypnagogue 4"
 "Fields of Rape"
 "So: This Empire Is Nothing"
 "Death of the Corn"
 "Locust"

Personnel
 David Tibet – vocals
 Michael Cashmore – guitar, bass
 Maja Elliott – piano
 Joe Budenholzer – guitar
 Graham Jeffery – piano
 Joolie Wood – violin, whistle, recorder
 John Contreras – cello
 Karl Blake – vocals
 Finn Sands – vocals
 Michael Lawrence – sound
 Lauren Winton – visuals
 Cosey Tutti Fanni
 Chris Carter

References

Current 93 albums
2004 live albums